Miss India Worldwide 1995 was the fifth edition of the international female pageant. The final was held in New York City, New York, United States. Total number of contestants were not known. Nirupama Anand  of Hong Kong crowned as winner at the end of the event.

Delegates
 – Stephanie Lushington
 – Nirupama Anand
 – Nita Kanjee

External links
http://www.worldwidepageants.com/

References

1995 beauty pageants